SBSO may refer to:
 Santa Barbara County Sheriff's Office
 Simón Bolívar Symphony Orchestra